Glaciibacter is a psychrophilic genus of bacteria from the family of Microbacteriaceae. The type species, Glaciibacter superstes, has been isolated from ice from the Fox permafrost tunnel from Alaska.

References

Microbacteriaceae
Bacteria genera